Chris Sun Yuk-han is the current Secretary for Labour and Welfare in Hong Kong, appointed on 1 July 2022 as part of John Lee's administration.

Biography 
According to his official government profile, Sun in 1994 joined the Administrative Service, and was appointed as the Deputy Secretary for Food and Health (Health) in 2011, the Deputy Secretary for Financial Services and the Treasury (Financial Services) in 2017, and the Commissioner for Labour in 2020.

Secretary for Labour and Welfare 
In July 2022, Sun attended a seminar to "learn and promote" the spirit of Xi Jinping's important speech.

On 21 October 2022, after Lee had said 140,000 people had left the workforce in the past 2 years, with about two-thirds of them highly skilled, Sun said it didn't necessarily mean they had moved overseas, but did not elaborate. Lee previously rejected the use of the term "emigration wave" when describing the change in population. The emigration wave has been attributed to the government's strict COVID-19 policies and the political situation in Hong Kong.

Also on 21 October 2022, after Lee announced in his maiden policy address plans to try and attract worldwide talent to Hong Kong, Sun publicly criticized a Ming Pao newspaper cartoon that depicted a bulletin board advertisement which "urgently" sought for "world-class talent" to come to Hong Kong, with those who were "accepting of strict governance" being given priority. Sun said the cartoon was "absurd and a serious deviation from the truth" and "Such self-righteous humour will only damage Hong Kong's image."

On 24 October 2022, Sun said that there was no need to compare Hong Kong to Singapore for talent acquisition, and that Hong Kong's talent loss was attributed to the COVID-19 pandemic.

In November 2022, Sun said that he was confident that the government would be able to attract foreign talent under Lee's policy address, saying "From next year onwards until 2025, we should be able to attract at least every year 35,000 talents to fill the gap in the local market."

In December 2022, Sun rejected calls from lawmakers who said that the government should set up a committee to come up with a population policy, with lawmaker Simon Lee saying that Sun was reacting passively to the problem of decreased birth rates and a shrinking workforce population in Hong Kong. At the same month, he was tested positive for COVID-19.

In January 2023, Sun said that government figures that show approximately 25% of people in Hong Kong being under the poverty line was "flawed" and did not give a full picture of the situation.

Top Talent Pass Scheme 
In February 2023, Sun revealed that the Top Talent Pass Scheme had approximately two thirds of all applicants come from mainland China. Most of the rest of the "overseas" applicants still hold a mainland Chinese passport; sources estimated that up to 95% of all applicants have a mainland Chinese passport. The program was announced in October 2022, with a "global drive".

After He Jiankui, a formerly jailed mainland Chinese citizen, was approved for the Top Talent Pass Scheme, Sun acknowledged that applicants do not need to declare their criminal history. Being asked by reporters about the case, Sun said that he would not make comments on individual cases, as this would "not [be] appropriate" for him. He Jiankui also said that despite being approved for the visa, he had no plans to move to Hong Kong. After the incident, the government said that future applicants must declare their past criminal records.

After multiple posts on mainland Chinese online platforms discussed using the visa to give birth to children in Hong Kong, which would give benefits such as right of abode and permanent residency to the children, government authorities warned that mainland Chinese women should not misuse the visa to give birth in Hong Kong.

References 

Living people
Government officials of Hong Kong
1971 births